Dürrlauingen is a municipality in the district of Günzburg in Bavaria in Germany.

Transport
The municipality has a railway station, on the Ulm–Augsburg line.

References

Populated places in Günzburg (district)